Said Rahim is a Pakistani politician from Daggar Buner District, who served as a member of the Khyber Pakhtunkhwa Assembly from 2008 to 2013 belong to the Awami National Party (ANP).

References

Living people
Pashtun people
Khyber Pakhtunkhwa MPAs 2013–2018
Awami National Party MPAs (Khyber Pakhtunkhwa)
People from Buner District
1950 births